The N-211 is a highway in Aragon, Spain. It connects the Autovía A-2 between Alcolea del Pinar and Fraga through Monreal del Campo, Alcañiz and Caspe, communicating Madrid with Catalonia. It is an alternative route for N-II/A-2.

There have been demands that this highway be widened and upgraded to Autovía status in certain stretches, mainly between Guadalajara and Teruel. 

The central stretch of this highway, between Molina de Aragón and Calanda, runs through the mountainous areas of the Sistema Ibérico range.

Main towns and mountain passes
 Alcolea del Pinar A-2
 Maranchón
 Mazarete
 Anquela del Ducado
 Molina de Aragón
 Castellar de la Muela 
 El Pobo de Dueñas
 Pozuel del Campo
 Monreal del Campo A-23
 Caminreal
 Vivel del Río Martín
 Martín del Río
 Montalbán N-420
 Castel de Cabra 
 Puerto de las Traviesas 1180 m
 Cañizar del Olivar/La Zoma/
 Venta de la Pintada A-1702
 Gargallo
 La Mata de los Olmos
 Los Olmos
 Alcorisa
 Calanda
 Alcañiz N-232
 Caspe
 Mequinenza
 Torrente de Cinca
 Fraga N-II A-2 AP-2

See also
Autovía A-2

References

External links
Los ligallos de CHA en las comarcas del Bajo Aragón Caspe y Bajo Cinca han denunciado la "situación de abandono" en la que se encuentra la carretera N-- 211 entre Caspe y Mequinenza
National roads in Spain
Transport in Aragon